Parveen Rizvi, better known as Sangeeta, (born 14 June 1947) is a Pakistani film actress, filmmaker and director of television drama serials.

Early life
Parveen Rizvi was born on 14 June 1947 in Karachi, British India. Parveen Rizvi's (or Sangeeta's) mother Mehtab Rizvi also had a career in show business. Additionally, Parveen's younger sister, Nasreen Rizvi (professionally known as Kaveeta) is also associated with Pakistani cinema. The British-American actress Jiah Khan was her niece.

Career

Acting 
In 1969, Sangeeta appeared on the film Koh-e-Noor (1969) as a child star; it was directed by Agha Husaini. In 1971, she moved to Lahore from her birthplace of Karachi and started a more serious career in Lollywood movies in Lahore. Her role as a supporting actress in Riaz Shahid's movie Yeh Aman (1971) was well-liked by the Pakistani public. She went on to act in dozens of other movies before deciding to become a film producer-director with her own film Society Girl in 1976. Sangeeta has over 120 films to her credit as an actress and a producer-director. In 2022 on August 14, she was honored by the Government of Pakistan with the Pride of Performance for her contributions towards the film and television industry.

Film directing
Sangeeta directed her debut film in 1976, Society Girl, which was a box-office hit. Her second film as director was Mujhay Galay Laga Lo, starring Sangeeta, Kaveeta, Ghulam Mohiuddin, Nayyar Sultana, and Bahar Begum. In 1978, she directed the critically acclaimed film Mutthi Bhar Chawal. Her film Mian Biwi Razi (1982) celebrated its Platinum Jubilee and was a highly successful movie. Her film Thori Si Bewafai was the first Pakistani film to be shot in United States. During the 1990s, she directed commercially successful films like Khilona (1996) and Nikah (1998). In 2019, she directed the romantic film Sirf Tum Hi To Ho.

Personal life 
Sangeeta's first marriage was to fellow Pakistani actor Humayun Qureshi. Together, they had a daughter. After some years, this marriage failed and they divorced. Sangeeta,then married the business tycoon Naveed Akbar Butt with him she had two daughter but they divorced and took the custoday of her daughters. She is also the aunt of British American actress Jiah Khan.

Filmography

As director

As actress

Television series

Awards and recognition

References

External links
 

1947 births
Living people
Muhajir people
Nigar Award winners
Pakistani film actresses
Pakistani film directors
Actresses in Pashto cinema
Pakistani film producers
Pakistani television actresses
Actresses in Punjabi cinema
Pakistani television directors
20th-century Pakistani actresses
Actresses in Urdu cinema
21st-century Pakistani actresses
Recipients of the Pride of Performance
Women television directors
Rizvi family